James Albertus Tawney (January 3, 1855 – June 12, 1919) was an American blacksmith, machinist and U.S. politician and a member of the United States House of Representatives from Minnesota. He was the first House Majority Whip, holding that position from 1899 to 1905.

Early life
Tawney was born in Mount Pleasant Township, near Gettysburg, Adams County, Pennsylvania. He apprenticed with his father as a blacksmith, and subsequently learned the trade of machinist. In 1877, he moved to Winona, Minnesota, where he was employed as a blacksmith and machinist until 1881. He attended the law department of the University of Wisconsin–Madison, and was admitted to the bar in 1882 and commenced practice in Winona.

Political career
Tawney was elected to the Minnesota Senate in 1890. In 1892, he was elected to Congress as a Republican, and served in the 53rd, 54th, 55th, 56th, 57th, 58th, 59th, 60th, and 61st congresses. During his time in Congress, Tawney served as Majority Whip and as chairman of the House Committee on Appropriations.

In 1910 he was defeated in the Republican primary by 30-year-old Sydney Anderson, who had the support of Theodore Roosevelt, Gifford Pinchot and other Progressive Republicans. Anderson ran on a platform of drastically reduced tariffs and opposition to Cannonism (with which Tawney was identified).

After Congress 
Tawney was a member of the International Joint Commission (created to prevent disputes regarding the use of Boundary Waters between the United States and Canada) from 1911 until his death, serving as chairman of the United States section from September 17, 1911, to December 1, 1914.

Tawney died at Excelsior Springs, Clay County, Missouri.

References
 Minnesota Legislators Past and Present

1855 births
1919 deaths
American blacksmiths
Machinists
Republican Party members of the Minnesota House of Representatives
Republican Party Minnesota state senators
University of Wisconsin–Madison alumni
University of Wisconsin Law School alumni
Republican Party members of the United States House of Representatives from Minnesota
19th-century American politicians
People from Gettysburg, Pennsylvania
People from Winona, Minnesota